James Adamson is the name of:
 James C. Adamson (born 1946), NASA astronaut and retired US Army colonel
 James B. Adamson, business executive and former CEO of Burger King
 James Bradshaw Adamson (1921–2003), Major General in the US Army
 James Hazel Adamson (1829–1902), Australian artist and inventor
 Jim Adamson (1905–1991), Australian rules footballer
 Jimmy Adamson (1929–2011), English footballer
 Jimmy Adamson (Scottish footballer) (born c. 1920), Scottish professional footballer